Amblyseius araraticus is a species of mite in the family Phytoseiidae.

References

araraticus
Articles created by Qbugbot
Animals described in 1972